Xuxa e os Duendes the soundtrack of the film of the same name, released in 2002 by Som Livre. The album consists of songs performed by the protagonist, the presenter Xuxa Meneghel and other artists. The soundtrack was released in early 2002, shortly after the release of the film on DVD. The soundtrack brings several artists such as Angélica, Carlinhos Brown, and Wanessa Camargo. The soundtrack was released in CD and cassette formats.

The album has 14 tracks, 7 songs and 7 instruments. They would participate in the compositions: Vanessa Rangel, Michael Sullivan, Carlos Colla, Nando Cordel and Maurício Gaetani.

Track listing

References

External links 
 Xuxa e os Duendes at Discogs

2001 soundtrack albums
Pop soundtracks
Musical film soundtracks
Fantasy film soundtracks
Adventure film soundtracks